Paulette Lynch is a Jamaican former cricketer who played as a bowler. She appeared in four One Day Internationals for International XI at the 1973 World Cup. She played domestic cricket for Jamaica.

References

External links 
 
 

Living people
Date of birth missing (living people)
Year of birth missing (living people)
Jamaican women cricketers
International XI women One Day International cricketers